General elections were held in the Netherlands on 26 May 1937. The Roman Catholic State Party remained the largest party in the House of Representatives, winning 31 of the 100 seats.

Results

References

General elections in the Netherlands
Netherlands
1937 in the Netherlands
May 1937 events
1937 elections in the Netherlands